The 2004 BMW Open was a men's tennis tournament played on outdoor clay courts in Munich, Germany and was part of the International Series of the 2004 ATP Tour. The tournament ran from 26 April until 2 May 2004. Unseeded Nikolay Davydenko won the singles title.

Finals

Singles

 Nikolay Davydenko defeated  Martin Verkerk 6–4, 7–5
 It was Davydenko's 1st title of the year and the 3rd of his career.

Doubles

 James Blake /  Mark Merklein defeated  Julian Knowle /  Nenad Zimonjić 6–2, 6–4
 It was Blake's 3rd title of the year and the 6th of his career. It was Merklein's only title of the year and the 4th of his career.

References

External links
 Official website 
 Official website 
 ATP tournament profile

 
BMW Open
Bavarian International Tennis Championships